The German publishing company  was founded 1826 in Gotha by Joseph Meyer, moved 1828 to Hildburghausen and 1874 to Leipzig.

The shareholders moved the company to Mannheim in West Germany in 1953.

In 1984  amalgamated with its biggest competitor in the market of reference works,  of Wiesbaden to Bibliographisches Institut & F. A. Brockhaus AG, having their seat in Mannheim. After the German reunification the company regained its former properties in Leipzig in 1991.

See also 
 Verlag Enzyklopädie

References

External links

1826 establishments in Germany
Companies based in Leipzig
Companies established in 1826
Mass media in Gotha
Mass media in Leipzig
Mass media in Mannheim
Publishing companies of Germany
Book publishing companies of Germany